John Kean may refer to:
John Kean (South Carolina politician) (1756–1795), South Carolina delegate to Continental Congress
John Kean (New Jersey politician) (1852–1914), U.S. Senator from New Jersey
John Kean (Canadian politician) (1820–1892), politician from Ontario, Canada
John T. Kean (1857–?), Lieutenant Governor of South Dakota

See also
John Keane (disambiguation)
John Keen (disambiguation)
John Keene (disambiguation)